Anisuzzaman (18 February 1937 – 14 May 2020) was a Bangladeshi academic of Bengali literature.

He was an activist who took part in the Language Movement (1952), participated in Mass Uprising (1969), and took part in the Bangladesh Liberation War (1971).

He was a member of the Planning Commission to the Government of Bangladesh during the Bangladesh liberation war and a member of the National Education Commission set up by the government after liberation. He was inducted as a National Professor by the Government of Bangladesh in 2018.

Early life and education
Anisuzzaman was born in Calcutta in 1937. Along with his family, he moved to Khulna after the 1947 partition. After about a year they moved to Dhaka. His father ATM Moazzem was a homeopathy practitioner and his grandfather, Sheikh Abdur Rahim, was a journalist and writer. His first piece of writing, a story, was published in Nowbahar, a literary magazine, in 1950. He completed his HSC from Jagannath College. He obtained his bachelor's in 1956 and master's in 1957 in Bengali from the University of Dhaka. At the university, he worked with Muhammad Shahidullah, Muhammad Abdul Hye and Munier Chowdhury. He completed his Ph.D. in 1962 at the age of 25 from the same university. He was a post-doctoral fellow at the University of Chicago during 1964–65 and a Commonwealth Academic Staff fellow at the University of London (1974–75).

Career

Anisuzzaman served as a faculty member at the University of Dhaka during 1959–69, 1985–2003 and 2005–08. He taught Bengali at the University of Chittagong during 1969–85. From 1978 to 1983, he was associated with research projects of the United Nations University. He was a visiting fellow at the University of Paris (1994), North Carolina State University (1995) and University of Calcutta (2010), and a visiting professor at the Visva-Bharati (2008–09, 2011).

Anisuzzaman was a member of the Planning Commission to the Government of Bangladesh during the Bangladesh liberation war and a member of the National Education Commission set up by the government after liberation. He was responsible for the Bengali language part of the Constitution of Bangladesh adopted in November 1972. He served as Chairman of the Trustee Board of the Nazrul Institute and has been the president of the Bangla Academy since 2011.

Activism
Anisuzzaman took part in the Language Movement (1952), participated in Mass Uprising (1969), took part in the War of Liberation (1971) and was the secretary of the Bangladesh Teachers' Association in 1971. He was involved in the anti-autocracy movement (1990).

In 2015, Anisuzzaman received death threats from Islamic extremists.

Literary works

Awards

 Bangla Academy Literary Award for research (1970)
 Ekushey Padak, an award given by the State, for his contribution to education (1985)
 Ananda Puraskar for publishing a series of 14 cassettes titled Oitijjher Ongikar (1994)
 Honorary D.Lit, Rabindra Bharati University, Calcutta (2005)
 Sarojini Basu Award, University of Calcutta (2008)
 Pandit Iswarchandra Vidyasagar Gold Plaque, Asiatic Society of Kolkata (2011)
 Padma Bhushan, on contribution of literature and education (2014)
 Independence Day Award for literature in 2015 by the Government of Bangladesh
 Nilkanta Sarkar Gold Medal, University of Dhaka
 Dawood Prize for literature, Pakistan Writers' Guild
 Star Lifetime Award (2016)
 Ananda Puraskar for his autobiography Bipula Prithibi (The Vast World) (2017)
 Jagattarini Medal, The University of Calcutta
 Khan Bahadur Ahsanullah Gold Medal 2018
SAARC (South Asian Association for Regional Cooperation) Literature Award 2019

Personal life
Anisuzzaman was married to Siddiqua Zaman. He was an secular humanist, having lost faith in organised religion during his youth.

Death
Anisuzzaman died from multi organ failure at Combined Military Hospital in Dhaka on 14 May 2020. He was admitted to Universal Medical College Hospital after falling sick about three weeks prior to his death. Later he was shifted to CMH as his condition was not improving. Sample was collected for COVID-19 test after his death and it came positive. He is buried at Azimpur Graveyard in Dhaka in line with the guidelines for the burial of COVID-19 patients during the COVID-19 pandemic in Bangladesh.

References

1937 births
2020 deaths
Bengali-language writers
University of Dhaka alumni
Academic staff of the University of Dhaka
Academic staff of the University of Chittagong
Bengali writers
Recipients of the Ekushey Padak
Recipients of the Padma Bhushan in literature & education
Recipients of the Ananda Purashkar
Recipients of the Independence Day Award
Advisors of Caretaker Government of Bangladesh
Recipients of Bangla Academy Award
Deaths from the COVID-19 pandemic in Bangladesh
Bangladesh Krishak Sramik Awami League central committee members
Bengali Muslims
21st-century Bengalis
20th-century Bengalis
20th-century Bangladeshi writers
20th-century Bangladeshi male writers
Writers from Kolkata
Writers from Dhaka